Club Sportif Chênois is a Swiss association football club, playing in the Swiss 2. Liga Interregional. It plays in the municipality of Thônex.

History

Formed in 1907 as FC Thônex, the club adopted its current name in 1924. The club competed in the Intertoto Cup in 1977 and 1979.

References

External links
 Official website

CS Chenois
1907 establishments in Switzerland
Association football clubs established in 1907